Swisscows is a web search engine launched in 2014, a project of Hulbee AG, a company based in Egnach, Switzerland. It uses semantic data recognition that gives faster answers to queries and claims to not store users' data. Swisscows also deems itself family-friendly, with explicit results entirely omitted. The engine's servers are based in underground data centers under the Swiss Alps, and geographically outside of EU and US.

Swisscows uses Bing for web search, but has also built its own index for the German language edition. It also has shopping search, music search (powered by SoundCloud), and a language translator powered by Yandex.

History 
Swisscows was founded in 2014 by Andreas Wiebe.

As of 2018, there were 20 million monthly search queries, according to Hulbee CEO, Andreas Wiebe.

In January 2021, the company launched TeleGuard, a messaging app that intends to focus on privacy and data protection.

See also
 Comparison of web search engines
 List of search engines

References

External links
Official Website

Internet search engines